Kwan is a hip hop/pop music group from Helsinki, Finland. Most visible members of the band are the two vocalists Mariko (Mari Liisa Pajalahti) and Tidjan (Ossi Bah Tidiane). The band started as a hip hop act, but nowadays the songs contain more singing than rapping.

The first album, Dynasty, sold platinum in Finland, the second one, The Die Is Cast double platinum.

Trivia
In spring 2007, lead vocalist Mariko is participating in the Finnish season 2 of Dancing with the Stars, dancing with Aleksi Seppänen. Contrary to expectations and with no ballroom dancing background whatsoever she eventually became the odds-on favourite to go all the way and win the competition. On 22 April 2007 they beat Sari Siikander and Mikko Ahti to win the final.

Discography

Studio albums
 Dynasty (2001)
 The Die Is Cast (2002)
 Love Beyond This World (2004)
 Little Notes (2006)

Singles
 Padam (2001)
 Microphoneaye (2001)
 Late (2001)
 Rock Da House (2001)
 The Die Is Cast (2002)
 I Wonder (Promo-CD, 2002)
 Rain (2002)
 Shine (2002)
 Chillin' At The Grotto (2002)
 Unconditional Love (2004)
 Decadence Of The Heart (2004)
 Sharks In The Bloody Waters (2004)
 Diamonds (2006)
 Tainted Love (2006)
 10,000 Light Years (2009)
 One Last Time (2014)

External links
Official Website Broken link!

Finnish hip hop groups
Finnish pop music groups
Musical groups established in 2000